O Grande Circo Mistico (The Great Mystical Circus) is a Brazilian musical first performed in 1983.

Originally intended as a ballet for the Ballet Teatro Guaira, the story was inspired by the poem of Parnassianist/modernist Jorge de Lima and incorporates music, ballet, opera, circus, theater and poetry. It tells the story of a great love affair between an aristocrat and an acrobat and the saga of the Austrian family that owned the Circus Knieps, and their adventures around the world during the early 20th Century.

Early success saw a tour around Brazil and Portugal, selling over 200,000 tickets to over 200 performances.

The soundtrack is composed by Chico Buarque and Edu Lobo.

Soundtrack track list
Abertura do circo (Opening Of The Circus) – instrumental
Beatriz – Milton Nascimento
Valsa dos clowns (Waltz of Clowns) – Jane Duboc
Opereta do casamento (Wedding Operetta) – Coro
A história de Lily Braun (The story of Lily Braun) – Gal Costa
Oremus – Coro
Meu Namorado (My Boyfriend) – Simone
Ciranda da bailarina – Coro Infantil
Sobre todas as coisas (About all things) – Gilberto Gil
O Tatuador (The Newbie) (instrumental)
A bela e a fera (The Beauty and the Beast) – Tim Maia
O circo místico (The Mystical Circus) – Zizi Possi
Na carreira (Career) – Chico Buarque & Edu Lobo

References

Brazilian plays
1983 musicals